Frondihabitans is a Gram-positive, non-spore-forming and non-motil genus of bacteria from the family of Microbacteriaceae.

References

Microbacteriaceae
Bacteria genera